The 1968 United States presidential election in Missouri took place on November 5, 1968. All 50 states and the District of Columbia were part of the 1968 United States presidential election. Voters chose 12 electors to the Electoral College, which selected the president and vice president.

Former Vice President Richard Nixon, the Republican nominee, narrowly won Missouri with 811,932 votes and 44.87% of the vote, with Vice President Hubert Humphrey, the Democratic nominee, taking 791,444 votes and 43.74% of the vote, followed by American Independent George Wallace, who took 206,126 votes and 11.39% of the vote. Wallace's strongest support came from the Missouri Bootheel, with its significant rural black population and powerful cultural and geographic ties to Kentucky's Jackson Purchase, the Arkansas Delta and West Tennessee. He carried the state's southeasternmost county, Pemiscot, and ran second ahead of Nixon in two others nearby. As of the 2020 presidential election, this is the last election in which Missouri voted for a different candidate than neighboring Arkansas.

Nixon overcame Humphrey's 85,000-vote margin in St. Louis by dominating the state's interior and holding his deficit to Humphrey in Jackson County, where most of Kansas City is located, to 21,000 votes.

Results

Results by county

See also
 United States presidential elections in Missouri

Notes

References

Missouri
1968
1968 Missouri elections